The Milligan and Forbes Warehouse in Bradford, West Yorkshire, England is a grade II listed building built as the eponymous stuff merchants' warehouse in the 19th century. It is considered the city's first building in the Palazzo style and was very influential on 19th century Bradford architecture.

History 

Robert Milligan was born in Kirkcudbright, Dumfries and Galloway on 10 October 1786.

He settled in Bradford in about 1810 and established a drapers shop in Kirkgate,
 eventually beginning a career as a stuff merchant. He became head of the firm of Milligan, Forbes and Co that became synonymous with the stuff trade in Bradford. Milligan was the first Mayor of Bradford (1847–48) and subsequently Liberal M.P. for the borough in three successive Parliaments between 1851 and 1857. His partner, London traveller Henry Forbes was also mayor of Bradford in 1849–50.

The firm decided to build a new warehouse for home trade and a site was purchased on Hall Ings next to the soon to be built St George's Hall. Andrew and Delauney, who would later build impressive structures in Bradford's Little Germany district, were the architectural firm chosen to design the building. The style is similar and perhaps based on the warehouses created by Edward Walters in Manchester around this time.
Both St George's Hall and Milligan and Forbes were completed in 1853, with the warehouse considered today as Bradford's first Palazzo building. It was intended to complement its neighbour and indeed it was described in the Imperial Gazetteer of England and Wales (published 1870 - 72) as "not much inferior to that pile in magnificence".

In the 1920s, Bradford's local newspaper company, the Telegraph and Argus moved into the building and is still operating, on a massively-reduced scale, from there today. Due to the increasing demands of newspaper production, a large extension was added to the original Victorian building. The Bradford architects Robinson Design Partnership, designed the smoked-glass press hall opened in 1981. This is now a white elephant, standing disused and as the newspaper's connection with the city of its birth has become at best tenuous. It is printed in Greater Manchester, its advertising is typeset in India and for more than 20 years tens of millions of pounds from Bradford's economy have been sent to the USA to the shareholders of the owners, Gannett, while the management has cut staffing to a minimum, outsourcing many operations to places as far apart as Oldham and even south Wales to reduce costs and increase profits. As a result, sales have plummeted as the paper's reputation as a source of news has diminished.

See also
Listed buildings in Bradford (City Ward)

References

External links 

 British Listed Buildings.

Grade II listed buildings in West Yorkshire
Buildings and structures in Bradford